Everybody's Tennis, known as Hot Shots Tennis in North America and in Japan as , is a sports video game developed by Clap Hanz and published by Sony Computer Entertainment. It is the sixth game in the Everybody's Golf series and the third released for PlayStation 2.

In September 2016, the game was ported to PlayStation 4 via the PS2 Classics service.

Gameplay
The game has 14 characters, 5 umpires, and 11 tennis courts. There are 3 different modes to choose from, which are Challenge Mode, Tennis with Everybody, and Training Mode. In Challenge, you play against computer-controlled opponents in order to unlock things like alternate costumes for characters and more courts to play on. In Tennis with Everybody, you can play matches with 1 to 4 players. The training mode lets you practice positioning and timing shots. You can choose from service, volley, smash and general practices in this mode.

Few of the characters from the previous games of the series (both American and Japanese) make cameo appearances on the courts (usually only in Singles matches). Suzuki and Gloria return as being playable characters.

Reception

The game received "average" reviews according to the review aggregation website Metacritic. In Japan, Famitsu gave it a score of 32 out of 40.

References

External links
 

2006 video games
PlayStation 2 games
PlayStation 2-only games
Sony Interactive Entertainment games
Tennis video games
Everybody's Golf
Video games developed in Japan